How Sweet It Is is the second live album by the Jerry Garcia Band. It was released in 1997, two years after Jerry Garcia's death. Like the band's self-titled first live release, it was recorded in the spring of 1990 at The Warfield in San Francisco, California.

Critical reception

On Allmusic, Stephen Thomas Erlewine said, "... How Sweet It Is captures the Jerry Garcia Band running through a selection of originals and covers. While it isn't as fluid or surprising as the double-disc 1991 set Jerry Garcia Band, which was culled from the same shows, it's nevertheless an entertaining set, especially for devoted fans, who will cherish previously unheard Garcia covers of songs like 'Think' and the title track."

In The Music Box, John Metzger wrote, "How Sweet It Is is the long-awaited follow-up to the two-disc Jerry Garcia Band set that was released in 1991. Culled from the same period of live performances, this effort delivers ten more songs that explore the magical relationship between Jerry Garcia, bassist John Kahn, and keyboardist Melvin Seals."

Track listing
"How Sweet It Is (To Be Loved by You)" (Brian Holland, Lamont Dozier, Eddie Holland) – 6:20
"Tough Mama" (Bob Dylan) – 5:41
"That's What Love Will Make You Do" (James Banks, Eddie Marion, Henderson Thigpen) – 8:03
"Someday Baby" (Lightnin' Hopkins) – 8:54
"Cats Under the Stars" (Robert Hunter, Jerry Garcia) – 8:59
"Tears of Rage" (Dylan, Richard Manuel) – 7:54
"Think" (Jimmy McCracklin, Deadric Malone) – 7:18
"Gomorrah" (Hunter, Garcia) – 6:38
"Tore Up over You" (Hank Ballard) – 7:19
"Like a Road Leading Home" (Don Nix, Dan Penn) – 10:12

Personnel
Jerry Garcia Band
Jerry Garcia – guitar, vocals
Melvin Seals – organ
John Kahn – bass
David Kemper – drums
Gloria Jones – vocals
Jackie LaBranch – vocals
Production
Producers – John Cutler, Steve Parish
Recording and mixing – John Cutler
Engineers – Jeffrey Norman, Dave Roberts
Mastering – Joe Gastwirt
Sound – Mike Brady, Uwe Willenbacher
Photography – Ken Friedman
Cover photography - Mike Conway
Design – Gecko Graphics
Liner notes – Steve Silberman

References

Jerry Garcia Band live albums
1997 live albums
Grateful Dead Records live albums